Jenishbek Nazaraliev is a drug rehabilitation professional and politician in Kyrgyzstan. He ran for the presidency in the presidential election of 2009, but withdrew from the election on election day claiming irregularities in the voting process.

Life 
Nazaraliev was born on 8 May 1961 in the city of Tokmok, Chüy oblast, Kyrgyzstan. Since he was born the day before Victory day, his parents named him Jenish (meaning "victory" in Kyrgyz). His father was a psychiatrist and his mother was a teacher. Nazaraliev has three brothers (two older, one younger), and two younger sisters.

Since his father was sent to work at a dispensary in Osh, Nazaraliev spent his childhood there, finishing Russian primary school #16. When he was young, he was very interested in sports, and practiced free-style wrestling and Karate.

In 1984, he graduated from the Bishkek National Medical Institute. he first worked at a local psycho-neurological dispensary before moving to Moscow in 1991 for other opportunities. In 1993 he returned to Bishnek and opened the region's first private narcological clinic. The clinic, which is known for using atropine comas and other outdated methods, is still operated by Nazaraliev.

In 1989, he received fame from publishing an article called "Змиелов" ("Snake-catcher" in Russian) in the newspaper Komsomolskaya Pravda.

Nazaraliev is the father of a daughter and a son.

2009 presidential election 
Nazaraliev ran for President of Kyrgyzstan in 2009, his campaign slogan was "Everything's within your reach". Nazaraliev withdrew from the election on election day, considering the election illegitimate. In the end, he received 19,283 (0.83%) votes.

External resources 
 Nazaraliev's campaign site
 Nazaraliev’s Rehabilitation Center

Footnotes

References 
 2009. Назаралиев инфо.

1961 births
Living people
Kyrgyzstani addiction physicians
Kyrgyzstani politicians